Westarctica (officially the Grand Duchy of Westarctica, formerly the Protectorate of Westarctica) is an unrecognized micronation in Antarctica, founded in 2001 by Travis McHenry, who styles himself as Grand Duke Travis. It claims a region of West Antarctica which has not been claimed by any nation state, comprising most of Marie Byrd Land. This wedge is located between the Ross Dependency claimed by New Zealand, and the Chilean Antarctic Territory, between 90 degrees and 150 degrees west longitude and south of the 60th parallel. The region includes  of land, making it the largest territory not claimed by any recognized nation. Westarctica claims over 2,000 citizens, but none of them reside within the claimed territory, which has no permanent settlements or research stations.

In 2018, the government of Westarctica established an honorary consul in Nerja, Spain, and continues to establish other honorary consulates around the world.

The Westarctican government has established a US-based charity to raise awareness about the impact of climate change on the wildlife of Antarctica and has also been active in speaking about the need for an effective global response to COVID-19.

See also 

 List of micronations
 Kingdom of Elleore
 Liberland
 Ladonia (micronation)

References

External links
 

West Antarctica micronations
Marie Byrd Land
States and territories established in 2001
2001 establishments in Antarctica